František Pála (born 28 March 1944) is a former professional tennis player from the Czech Republic who competed for Czechoslovakia. His son Petr was also a tennis player.

Career
The Czechoslovak player took part in 15 Davis Cup ties for his national team, the first in 1966. At a tie in Barcelona in 1972, Pala had a win over Manuel Orantes. Earlier that year, in a tie against Sweden, Pala defeated Björn Borg, although the Swede was only 15 at the time. In all he played 25 rubbers, of which he won 15, all but one of them in singles. He later served as Czechoslovak Davis Cup captain.

Pala, who won the Czechoslovakian Championships in 1973, played in the singles draw of 18 Grand Slam tournaments and made the third round three times, at the 1970 French Open, 1972 French Open and 1972 Wimbledon Championships.

He had his best year on the tennis circuit in 1972, when he was a finalist at Monte Carlo and Madrid, losing both matches to Ilie Năstase. As a doubles player he was able to reach three finals and won one of them, the 1977 BMW Open.

Grand Prix/WCT career finals

Singles: 2 (0–2)

Doubles: 3 (1–2)

References

External links
 
 
 Tennis academy František Pála - Pavel Vízner - Petr Pála

1944 births
Living people
People from Prague-East District
Czech male tennis players
Czechoslovak male tennis players
Sportspeople from the Central Bohemian Region